Jelanka  is a village in the administrative district of Gmina Rzeczniów, within Lipsko County, Masovian Voivodeship, in east-central Poland.

The village had a population of 184 at the 2011 census.

References

Jelanka